is a Japanese speed skater. He competed in two events at the 1980 Winter Olympics.

References

1957 births
Living people
Japanese male speed skaters
Olympic speed skaters of Japan
Speed skaters at the 1980 Winter Olympics
Sportspeople from Nagano Prefecture